Baffin Island Current (or Baffin Current) is an ocean current running south down the western side of Baffin Bay in the Arctic Ocean, along Baffin Island. Its sources are the West Greenland Current and outflow from the Arctic Ocean.

References

See also 
 Labrador Current
 East Greenland Current

Baffin Bay
Baffin Island
Currents of the Arctic Ocean